David Esrig (born September 23, 1935 in Haifa) is a Romanian theater director.

Education  
He studied directing at the Bucharest Caragiale Academy of Theatrical Arts and Cinematography.

Career 
In 1995, he founded the Athanor Academy of Performing Arts in Burghausen, which was relocated to Passau in 2014. Esrig is multiple Doctor h.c. in several universities in Romania and Moldova.

References

Romanian theatre directors
Israeli theatre directors
People from Haifa
1935 births
Living people
Romanian artists
Caragiale National University of Theatre and Film alumni